Amphidromus glaucolarynx is a species of air-breathing land snail, a terrestrial pulmonate gastropod mollusk in the family Camaenidae.

This is the only one amphidromine (left-handed and right-handed snails occur in the population) species in the subgenus Syndromus.

References

External links 

glaucolarynx
Gastropods described in 1861